Bromley-by-Bow is a London Underground station located on the Blackwall Tunnel Northern Approach Road in the Bromley-by-Bow area of London, United Kingdom. The station is below the Blackwall Tunnel Northern Approach Road and lies between Bow Road and West Ham stations on the District and Hammersmith & City lines, and is in both Travelcard Zones 2 and 3.

History

It was opened as a railway station called Bromley by the London, Tilbury and Southend Railway (LTSR) in 1858, on its new line to Barking from the terminus at Fenchurch Street, a more direct route than the route hitherto used. On 17 May 1869 a spur opened from Bow railway station on the North London Railway line to Bromley Junction, just to the west of the station. A shuttle service operated between Bow and Plaistow until wartime economies saw the service withdrawn on 1 January 1915. The main reason for building this spur was however for freight use.

Increasing use of the station to catch services provided by the LTSR, the NLR and Great Eastern Railway (GER)—which ran services from Fenchurch Street to North Woolwich—saw plans drawn up in 1892 to construct a new station. A fire on 20 December of that year saw these plans brought forward and work was started early in 1893.
The new station to the west of St. Leonards Street (now Blackwall Tunnel Northern Approach) was opened on 1 March 1894 and the old station on the other side of the bridge was closed.

In 1898 the goods yard was opened on the south side of the line and to the east of the station.

The construction of the Whitechapel and Bow Railway allowed the District Railway (now known as the District line) to start serving the station in 1902, and initially steam services operated through to East Ham with some operating as far as Upminster. The District Line joined the main line at Campbell Road Junction also to the west of the station (and Bromley Junction). Electrification of the system followed in 1905. Delayed by World War I, electrified tracks were extended by the London, Midland and Scottish Railway (LMS) to Upminster and through services fully resumed in 1932.

Congestion of the railway through Bromley saw additional tracks provided in 1905. Two new Local Lines (which were the new electrified lines) were added on the north side of the station along with two new platform faces and improved passenger facilities. The new lines, which stretched as far as Abbey Mills Junction (where the North Woolwich trains diverged from the main line), opened on 1 August 1905.

In 1912 the LTSR was taken over by the Midland Railway, although on 1 January 1923 this was grouped into the London Midland & Scottish Railway. In 1927 the local lines were re-signalled with colour light signalling.

The District Railway was incorporated into London Transport in 1933, and became known as the District line. The Hammersmith & City line (then part of the Metropolitan line) started operating services through Bromley on 4 May 1936. The 1947 timetable shows only a few services a day provided by the LMS and a frequent service provided by the District and a peak hours service of the Metropolitan line (now part of the Hammersmith & City line). After nationalisation of the railways in 1948 management of the station passed to British Railways London Midland region although it was then transferred to the Eastern Region on 20 February 1949. The remaining Fenchurch Street–Southend services were withdrawn in 1962 when the main lines were electrified with 25 kV overhead lines.

On 13 September 1959 the spur between Bromley and Bow (NLR) was closed and three years later in 1962, the goods yard closed. The station was renamed to Bromley-by-Bow in 1967, to prevent confusion with Bromley station in the London Borough of Bromley. The continued management of the station by an organisation now providing none of the services became more of an anomaly and in 1969 ownership transferred to the London Underground which came under the authority of the London Transport Executive of the Greater London Council. Another fire in February 1970 led to the demolition of the station buildings (dating from 1894) and a newer booking office opened on 11 June 1972. having been constructed by British Rail.

Bomb discovery
On 2 June 2008, an unexploded bomb from World War II was found near where the line crosses the Prescott Channel, not far from the station, causing disruption to trains.

The station today
The station entrance is at a higher level than the platforms (being situated on the road bridge crossing the rail tracks) which are accessible by stairs and lifts. There are no escalators. The station has four platforms, of which only two are currently in use; serving the District and Hammersmith & City lines, which share a track at this point, in both directions. The remaining two platforms formerly served the London, Tilbury and Southend line (now operated by c2c). Three ticket barriers and a gate control access to all platforms.

In 2018, lifts were installed at the station, the 73rd on the Underground to gain step-free access. All these upgrades were funded by Transport for London in partnership with Tower Hamlets and London Legacy Development Corporation.

Services

Hammersmith & City line
The typical off-peak service in trains per hour (tph) is:

6 tph eastbound to Barking
6 tph westbound to Hammersmith via King's Cross and Wood Lane

District line

This is the typical off-peak service frequency. During peak times trains also operate to Wimbledon. During off-peak times, 3 trains per hour from Wimbledon terminate at Barking (as of December 2014).

3 tph eastbound to Barking
6 tph westbound to Ealing Broadway
6 tph westbound to Richmond
3 tph westbound to Wimbledon

Connections
London Buses routes 323, 488 and D8 serve the station.

In popular culture
In the BBC soap opera EastEnders, the fictional Walford East Underground station takes the place of Bromley-by-Bow.

References

External links

London Transport Museum Photographic Archive

District line stations
Hammersmith & City line stations
Tube stations in the London Borough of Tower Hamlets
Former London, Tilbury and Southend Railway stations
Railway stations in Great Britain opened in 1858
Bromley-by-Bow